Tyrin J. Atwood (born November 4, 1997) is an American professional basketball player for Depiro Rabat Imtarfa of the Maltese Division One Basketball league. He played college basketball for Lamar.

Early life and high school career
Atwood attended Central High School in Beaumont, Texas. He was a 2015 District 22-5A first-team selection, alongside teammate Nijal Pearson. Atwood committed to Lamar University out of high school.

College career
Atwood was mostly a bench player during his first two seasons at Lamar. On January 26, 2019, Atwood was ruled out for the season after suffering a leg injury during an overtime win over Incarnate Word. He averaged 10.9 points and 5.3 rebounds per game in 19 games as a junior. Atwood scored a career-high 34 points and grabbed 10 rebounds on December 18, in a 79–73 overtime win over Southeastern Louisiana. He was named Southland Conference player of the week on February 24, 2020, after scoring 22 points in a 79–62 win over Texas A&M-Corpus Christi. As a senior, Atwood averaged 16.8 points, 7.0 rebounds, 1.8 assists and 1.4 steals per game, earning Second Team All-Southland honors. Due to the coronavirus pandemic, the season was cancelled following a win against McNeese State in the Southland Tournament. Lamar coach Tic Price called Atwood "one of the classiest guys I ever coached."

Professional career
On July 16, 2020, Atwood signed with the Svendborg Rabbits of the Basketligaen. On January 2, 2021, he signed with Depiro Rabat Imtarfa of the Maltese Division One Basketball league. Atwood re-signed with the team on August 2.

References

External links
Lamar Cardinals bio

1997 births
Living people
American expatriate basketball people in Denmark
American expatriate sportspeople in Malta
American men's basketball players
Basketball players from Texas
Lamar Cardinals basketball players
Svendborg Rabbits players
Small forwards
Sportspeople from Beaumont, Texas